När is a populated area, a socken (not to be confused with parish), on the Swedish island of Gotland, with 413 inhabitants in 2014. It comprises the same area as the administrative När District, established on 1January 2016.

The När Lighthouse is located east of the village on Närsholmen.

Geography 
När is the name of the socken as well as the district. It is also the name of the small village surrounding the medieval När Church, sometimes referred to as När kyrkby. It is situated on the east coast of Gotland.

, När Church belongs to När-Lau parish in Burs pastorat, along with the church in Lau.

Notable people 
 Henrik Munthe (1860 in När – 1958) geologist, particularly the Geology of Gotland
 Josefin Nilsson (1969 in När – 2016) singer and actress

References

External links 
Objects from När at the Digital Museum by Nordic Museum

Populated places in Gotland County